Darbandsar (also Romanized as Darme_sar ) is a former village in Rudbar-e Qasran Rural District, Rudbar-e Qasran District, Shemiranat County, Tehran Province, Iran. At the 2006 census, its population was 843, in 256 families.  It was subsequently annexed to the city of Shemshak darbandsar.

References 

Populated places in Shemiranat County
Former populated places in Tehran Province